Clarkeulia magnana is a species of moth of the family Tortricidae. It is found in Napo Province, Ecuador.

The wingspan is 38.5 mm. The ground colour of the forewings is light brownish, in the distal third more cream and spotted and suffused with brown. The markings are brown. The hindwings are brownish cream, densely spotted with brownish grey.

Etymology
The species name refers to the size of the species and is derived from Latin magna (meaning large).

References

Moths described in 2009
Clarkeulia
Moths of South America
Taxa named by Józef Razowski